Eetu Mömmö (born 4 May 2002) is a Finnish professional footballer who plays as a forward for Besta deild karla club FH, on loand from Lecce.

Club career
On 19 August 2021, Mömmö signed with Italian club Lecce and was assigned to their Under-19 squad.

Career statistics

Club

References

2002 births
Living people
Finnish footballers
Association football forwards
Finland youth international footballers
Finland under-21 international footballers
Kakkonen players
Veikkausliiga players
FC Ilves players
U.S. Lecce players
Finnish expatriate footballers
Finnish expatriate sportspeople in Italy
Expatriate footballers in Italy